Long River may refer to:

 The Yangtze River, from the literal translation of its usual Chinese name Changjiang
 Any of several rivers named Long (meaning "Dragon River")
 Long Island River (Minnesota), a river of Minnesota, US
 Long River (Guangxi), a river system in Guangxi Province, China
 Long River, Prince Edward Island, a community in Canada

See also 
 List of rivers by length
 Long River Review, an American literary magazine